Garelochhead Training Camp is a military training camp located near Garelochhead in Scotland.

History
The camp was originally built in 1940 during World War II. Some 22,000 American servicemen were accommodated and trained at the camp prior to Operation Overlord. There is an extensive Training Area in the surrounding region that extends up Glen Fruin to the west bank of Loch Lomond and along Loch Long through Glen Mallan to DM Glen Douglas. The Range complex at Garelochhead is equipped for live firing up to platoon level, with additional grenade and mortar ranges. The camp itself can accommodate up to 500 personnel and has been used as a base by Strathclyde Police during protests at the nearby HMNB Clyde.

The Ministry of Defence built a new 100m grouping and zeroing range, a new 600m electronic firing range, a range warden's complex, a range console building and access tracks at the camp in 2014.

In August 2022, the Ministry of Defence announced plans to demolish the existing accommodation and replace it with modern energy efficient accommodation.

References

Barracks in Scotland
Installations of the British Army
Training establishments of the British Army